The Utti Jaeger Regiment (()) is the Finnish Army training and development centre for special forces and helicopter operations in charge of the Army Special Forces Unit and the Special Forces Qualification Course.

Function

Regiment 
The Utti Jaeger Regiment is responsible for training special forces for the Finnish Army as well as upkeeping high readiness of the Army Special Forces Unit and helicopter operations and performing executive assistance tasks. The regiment consists of around 400 hired personnel and 220 conscripts according to sources from 2018. Its Special Jaeger Company served during the War in Afghanistan, training security officials in medical care, firearms, and operational planning, and has been in standby duties as a part of the European Union Battlegroups and NATO Response Force. The Finnish special forces trace their history to the four long-range reconnaissance patrol detachments and Detached Battalion 4, which fought in the Continuation War and Lapland War during 1941–1944. After the wartime units were demobilized in November 1944, the Army reinitiated organized special forces training in February 1962 by establishing the Parachute Jaeger School (()) at Utti, near the city of Kouvola. On 1 January 1997, the Utti Jaeger Regiment was formed by merging the Parachute Jaeger School, Military Police School and Helicopter Wing.  The Parachute Jaeger School was later reformed into the Special Jaeger Battalion and the Helicopter Wing reinforced into the Helicopter Battalion.

Special Jaeger 
According to the newspaper Helsingin Sanomat, a typical special forces soldier has served in the Defence Forces for seven years and is around 28–29-years-old. On average, they run  in a Cooper test and bench press . Before applying for and attending the year-long Special Forces Qualification Course, they often have served as a paratrooper or a combat diver during conscript service. Approximately 12 students are chosen for the course out of a 100 applicants after a four-day exam. All of the course attendees are trained in communications, engineer and medical care, and receive specializations later, such as sniper, vehicle, high-altitude military parachuting, military intelligence or forward air control training. Those chosen for career tracts after the basic course serve at either Utti Jaeger Regiment or Special Operations Detachment of the Naval Reconnaissance Battalion, of the Coastal Brigade.

Organisation 
As of 2018, the Utti Jaeger Regiment is divided into four units in addition to the headquarters:
Special Jaeger Battalion
Special Jaeger Company – hosts the special jaeger non-commissioned officers, maintains special forces readiness and capabilities of the Army, and oversees the Special Forces Qualification Course.
Paratrooper Company – trains conscripts in basic long-range reconnaissance patrol, sissi, urban and air assault operations.
Helicopter Battalion – equipped with 20 NH90 tactical transport helicopters and 7 MD 500 light helicopters; responsible for all helicopter operations and training of the Defence Forces.
Support Company – trains conscripts in support tasks and handles logistics in cooperation with the Logistics Centre.
Logistics Centre

See also 
 Finnish Border Guard
 Finnish Defence Intelligence Agency
 Jäger (infantry)
 Lauri Törni
 Police Rapid Response Unit (Finland)

References

External links 

 

Kouvola
Army regiments of Finland
Military units and formations established in 1997
Special forces